The Human League has released 9 studio albums, a live album, a remix album, 13 compilations, 6 extended plays and 29 singles.

Albums

Studio albums

Live albums

Compilation albums

Box Set

Remix albums

Extended plays

Singles

Commercial singles

Promotional singles

Videography

Video and DVD releases

Music videos

Notes

References

External links
 The Human League on Discogs

Discography
Discographies of British artists
Pop music group discographies
New wave discographies